Louis Courtois may refer to:
 Louis Courtois (bobsleigh)
 Louis Courtois (illusionist)